Starhellinga or Sørbygdafeltet is a village in Stange Municipality in Innlandet county, Norway.

Notable people
Simen Schikulski, musician and bass player in the Norwegian grammy-winning pop band Team Me.

References

Stange
Villages in Innlandet